OGLE-2016-BLG-1195Lb is an extrasolar planet located about 22,000 light-years from Earth, in the galactic bulge, orbiting the 0.57 star OGLE-2016-BLG-1195L, discovered in 2017. Planet was detected using gravitational microlensing techniques managed by the Korea Astronomy and Space Science Institute and the Spitzer Space Telescope. 
Initially, it was believed the planet has a mass similar to Earth and is located about the same distance from its host star as the Earth is from the Sun,although it was expected to be a much colder.

In 2023, the planetary mass estimate was significantly increased to 9.91, resulting in it likely being a Neptune-like ice giant planet.

In popular culture
The planet has been referred to as Hoth due to its resemblance (before 2023 parameters update) to the planet with the same name from the Star Wars franchise. A similar exoplanet, OGLE-2005-BLG-390Lb, has also been compared to Hoth, by NASA in this instance.

See also

 Gliese 581c
 Gliese 581g
 OGLE-2005-BLG-169Lb
 OGLE-2005-BLG-390Lb
 OGLE-2016-BLG-1190Lb
 Optical Gravitational Lensing Experiment (OGLE)
 Planetary habitability

References

Exoplanets detected by microlensing
Exoplanets discovered in 2017
Terrestrial planets